MasterFormat is a standard for organizing specifications and other written information for commercial and institutional building projects in the U.S. and Canada. Sometimes referred to as the "Dewey Decimal System" of building construction, MasterFormat is a product of the Construction Specifications Institute (CSI) and Construction Specifications Canada (CSC). It provides a master list of Divisions, and Section numbers with associated titles within each Division, to organize information about a facility’s construction requirements and associated activities.

MasterFormat is used throughout the construction industry to format specifications for construction contract documents. The purpose of this format is to assist the user in organizing information into distinct groups when creating contract documents, and to assist the user searching for specific information in consistent locations. The information contained in MasterFormat is organized in a standardized outline format within 50 Divisions (16 Divisions pre-2004). Each Division is subdivided into a number of Sections.

History
After World War II, building construction specifications began to expand, as more advanced materials and choices were made available. The Construction Specifications Institute (CSI) was founded in 1948 and began to address the organization of specifications into a numbering system. In 1963, they published a format for construction specifications, with 16 major divisions of work. A 1975 CSI publication used the term MasterFormat. The last CSI MasterFormat publication to use the 16 divisions was in 1995, and this is no longer supported by CSI. In November 2004, MasterFormat expanded from 16 Divisions to 50 Divisions, reflecting innovations in the construction industry and expanding the coverage to a larger part of the construction industry. Revised editions were published in 2010, 2011, 2012, 2014, 2016, 2018, and 2020.

Timeline 
 1963: CSI introduces MasterFormat data as part of CSI Format for Construction Specifications
 1966: CSC produced The Building Construction Index with similar data
 1972: CSI and CSC merge their systems and publish as Uniform Construction Index
1978: First published under the name MasterFormat
 1995: Extensive public review with industry users
 2004: Major expansion to address overcrowded divisions. Additional divisions added to include infrastructure and process equipment divisions.

Advantages
Standardizing the presentation of such information improves communication among all parties involved in construction projects, which helps the project team deliver structures to owners according to their requirements, timelines, and budgets. The ASTM standard for sustainability assessment of building products relies on MasterFormat to organize the data. MasterFormat is an organizational component of Building Systems Design - SpecLink, MasterSpec, SpecText, National Master Specification (NMS), and SpecsIntact systems. Manufacturers will often publish specifications for their products based on MasterFormat. Design teams may maintain office master section based on MasterFormat and pull specifications from multiple sources. MasterFormat provides the overall organizational structure that makes pulling sections from different sources possible. 

MasterSpec and SpecText are specifications targeted to construction projects in the United States. NMS is targeted to construction projects in Canada. SpecsIntact is a specification processing system for preparing Unified Facilities Guide Specifications (UFGS). UFGS is required for design teams to use on United States Department of Defense and NASA construction projects. Using MasterFormat provides the design and construction teams a familiar organizational structure.

Current Divisions (August 2020)
The current MasterFormat Divisions are:

PROCUREMENT AND CONTRACTING REQUIREMENTS GROUP
Division 00 — Procurement and Contracting Requirements

SPECIFICATIONS GROUP

General Requirements Subgroup
Division 01 — General Requirements

Facility Construction Subgroup
Division 02 — Existing Conditions
Division 03 — Concrete
Division 04 — Masonry
Division 05 — Metals
Division 06 — Wood, Plastics, and Composites
Division 07 — Thermal and Moisture Protection
Division 08 — Openings
Division 09 — Finishes
Division 10 — Specialties
Division 11 — Equipment
Division 12 — Furnishings
Division 13 — Special Construction
Division 14 — Conveying Equipment

Facility Services Subgroup:
Division 21 — Fire Suppression
Division 22 — Plumbing
Division 23 — Heating, Ventilating, and Air Conditioning (HVAC) 
Division 25 — Integrated Automation
Division 26 — Electrical
Division 27 — Communications
Division 28 — Electronic Safety and Security

Site and Infrastructure Subgroup:
Division 31 — Earthwork
Division 32 — Exterior Improvements
Division 33 — Utilities
Division 34 — Transportation
Division 35 — Waterway and Marine Construction

Process Equipment Subgroup:
Division 40 — Process Interconnections
Division 41 — Material Processing and Handling Equipment
Division 42 — Process Heating, Cooling, and Drying Equipment
Division 43 — Process Gas and Liquid Handling, Purification and Storage Equipment
Division 44 — Pollution and Waste Control Equipment
Division 45 — Industry-Specific Manufacturing Equipment
Division 46 — Water and Wastewater Equipment
Division 48 — Electrical Power Generation

Pre-2020 Divisions

MASTERFORMAT 2018 EDITION

Same as MasterFormat 2016.

MASTERFORMAT 2016 EDITION

Same as MasterFormat 2014.

MASTERFORMAT 2014 EDITION

Same as MasterFormat 2012, except the following:
Division 40 — Process Interconnections (changed title)

MASTERFORMAT 2012 EDITION

Same as MasterFormat 2010.

MASTERFORMAT 2010 EDITION

Same as MasterFormat 2004, except the following:
Division 46 — Water and Wastewater Equipment (added)

MASTERFORMAT 2004 EDITION

Changed to 50 Divisions. All divisions were revised.

MASTERFORMAT 1995 EDITION

Same as MasterFormat 1988 except the following:
Division 2 — Site Construction

MASTERFORMAT 1988 EDITION

Before November 2004, MasterFormat was composed of 16 Divisions:
Division 1 — General Requirements
Division 2 — Sitework
Division 3 — Concrete
Division 4 — Masonry
Division 5 — Metals
Division 6 — Wood and Plastics
Division 7 — Thermal and Moisture Protection
Division 8 — Doors and Windows
Division 9 — Finishes 
Division 10 — Specialties
Division 11 — Equipment
Division 12 — Furnishings
Division 13 — Special Construction
Division 14 — Conveying Systems
Division 15 — Mechanical (Ex. Plumbing and HVAC)
Division 16 — Electrical

Related Organizational Formats
SectionFormat is a standard for organizing information within each Section. Like MasterFormat, SectionFormat is a joint publication of the Construction Specifications Institute (CSI) and Construction Specifications Canada (CSC). It is used by MasterSpec, SpecText, NMS, and SpecsIntact systems. It is also common among manufacture specifications and design firm office masters. A Section is divided into three Parts; "Part 1 - General," "Part 2 - Products," and "Part 3 - Execution." Each Part is further organized into a system of Articles and Paragraphs. MasterFormat's Division 01 is extensively coordinated with SectionFormat's Part 1 to reduce duplication of requirements common to multiple sections.
PageFormat is a standard for formatting text within a section. Like MasterFormat, PageFormat is a joint publication of the Construction Specifications Institute (CSI) and Construction Specifications Canada (CSC). It is used by MasterSpec, SpecText, and NMS. Design firms often use a modified version of PageFormat. SpecsIntact does not use PageFormat.
A relatively new strategy to classify the built environment, named OmniClass, incorporates the work results classification in its Table 22 Work Results.
The National Building Specification is a British specification standard.

References

External links
Official website
CSI's Latest information on MasterFormat

Building materials
Construction documents